Karcher or Kärcher is a surname. Notable people with the surname include:

 Alfred Kärcher, German industrialist
 Alan Karcher (1943–1999), New Jersey politician (father of Ellen Karcher)
 Amalie Kärcher (1819–1887), German artist
 Carl Karcher (1917–2008), restaurateur, founder of the Carl's Jr. hamburger chain
 Ellen Karcher (born 1964),  New Jersey politician, state senator (daughter of Alan Karcher)
 Ernst Friedrich Kärcher (1789–1855), German educator and philologist
 J. Clarence Karcher (1894-1978), geophysicist and inventor of the reflection seismograph and founder of what would become Texas Instruments
 Jim Karcher (1914–1997), American football player
 Nick Karcher (born 1997), American singer-songwriter
 Karl-Ehrhart Karcher (1918–1973), German World War II Schnellboot commander
 Ken Karcher (born 1963), American football player
 Mark Karcher (born 1978), American basketball player
 Margaret Karcher (1915–2006), American restaurateur

See also
 Kärcher, a German cleaning equipment manufacturer best known for high-pressure cleaning products